Mohit Kamal (born 2 January 1960) is a Bangladeshi psychiatrist specialized in narcotics/drug addiction related issues. He is a professor of Psychotherapy and a former director of National Institute of Mental Health and Hospital, Dhaka. He is also a fiction writer. In recognition of his contributions to child literature, he received Agrani Bank Shishu Academy Child literature Award in 2011 and won Bangla Academy Literary Award-2018 in fiction category.

Early life
Kamal was born on 2 January 1960 at Sandwip Upazila of Chittagong to Asadul Haq and Masuda Khatun. He completed his secondary education from Chittagong Collegiate School and College and higher secondary from Chittagong College. He obtained his MBBS degree from Sylhet MAG Osmani Medical College.

Awards 
 Agrani Bank Shishu Academy Child literature Award, 2011
 Bangla Academy Literary Award (2018)

References

1960 births
Bangladeshi male writers
Recipients of Bangla Academy Award
Living people
People from Sandwip Upazila

Sylhet MAG Osmani Medical College alumni